Vladimir Dmitriyevich Kuzmin-Karavayev (9 September 1859 – 17 February 1927) was a Russian legal scholar and liberal politician.

Biography 
Graduate of His Majesty's Page Corps and of the Alexander Military Law Academy. Professor in the Military Law Academy, 1890, and in the Nicholas Academy of General Staff, 1899–1903; professor at St. Petersburg University, 1909–1913.

Active participant in zemstvo congresses, 1904–1905. One of the founders of the Party of Democratic Reform; member of St. Petersburg City Duma; member of the First and Second Dumas. Barrister in St. Petersburg Court of Appeals, 1913. He was an active member of the irregular freemasonic lodge, the Grand Orient of Russia’s Peoples.

During the Russian civil war he was member of Yudenich's Political Conference. 

Kuzmin-Karavaev died in Paris.

References 

 V.I. Gurko. Features And Figures Of The Past. Government And Opinion In The Reign Of Nicholas II.

1859 births
1927 deaths
People from Bezhetsky District
People from Bezhetsky Uyezd
Party of Democratic Reform (Russia) politicians
Members of the 1st State Duma of the Russian Empire
Members of the 2nd State Duma of the Russian Empire
Russian Freemasons
Lawyers from Saint Petersburg
White movement people
White Russian emigrants to France
Recipients of the Order of St. Vladimir, 3rd class
Recipients of the Order of St. Anna, 2nd class
Recipients of the Order of St. Anna, 3rd class
Recipients of the Order of Saint Stanislaus (Russian), 2nd class
Recipients of the Order of Saint Stanislaus (Russian), 3rd class
Burials at the Cimetière parisien de Bagneux